The UCSC Genome Browser is an online and downloadable genome browser hosted by the University of California, Santa Cruz (UCSC). It is an interactive website offering access to genome sequence data from a variety of vertebrate and invertebrate species and major model organisms, integrated with a large collection of aligned annotations. The Browser is a graphical viewer optimized to support fast interactive performance and is an open-source, web-based tool suite built on top of a MySQL database for rapid visualization, examination, and querying of the data at many levels. The Genome Browser Database, browsing tools, downloadable data files, and documentation can all be found on the UCSC Genome Bioinformatics website.

History

Initially built and still managed by Jim Kent, then a graduate student, and David Haussler, professor of Computer Science (now Biomolecular Engineering) at the University of California, Santa Cruz in 2000, the UCSC Genome Browser began as a resource for the distribution of the initial fruits of the Human Genome Project. Funded by the Howard Hughes Medical Institute and the National Human Genome Research Institute, NHGRI (one of the US National Institutes of Health), the browser offered a graphical display of the first full-chromosome draft assembly of human genome sequence. Today the browser is used by geneticists, molecular biologists and physicians as well as students and teachers of evolution for access to genomic information.

Genomes

In the years since its inception, the UCSC Browser has expanded to accommodate genome sequences of all vertebrate species and selected invertebrates for which high-coverage genomic sequences is available, now including 108 species. High coverage is necessary to allow overlap to guide the construction of larger contiguous regions. Genomic sequences with less coverage are included in multiple-alignment tracks on some browsers, but the fragmented nature of these assemblies does not make them suitable for building full featured browsers. (more below on multiple-alignment tracks). The species hosted with full-featured genome browsers are shown in the table.

Apart from these 108 species and their assemblies, the UCSC Genome Browser also offers Assembly Hubs , web-accessible directories of genomic data that can be viewed on the browser and include assemblies that are not hosted natively on it. There, users can load and annotate unique assemblies for which UCSC does not provide an annotation database. A full list of species and their assemblies can be viewed in the GenArk Portal, including 2,589 assemblies hosted by both UCSC Genome Browser database and Assembly Hubs. An example can be seen in the Vertebrate Genomes Project assembly hub.

Browser functionality

The large amount of data about biological systems that is accumulating in the literature makes it necessary to collect and digest information using the tools of bioinformatics. The UCSC Genome Browser presents a diverse collection of annotation datasets (known as "tracks" and presented graphically), including mRNA alignments, mappings of DNA repeat elements, gene predictions, 
gene-expression data, disease-association data (representing the relationships of genes to diseases), and mappings of commercially available gene chips (e.g., Illumina and Agilent). The basic paradigm of display is to show the genome sequence in the horizontal dimension, and show graphical representations of the locations of the mRNAs, gene predictions, etc. Blocks of color along the coordinate axis show the locations of the alignments of the various data types. The ability to show this large
variety of data types on a single coordinate axis makes the browser a handy tool for the vertical integration of the data.

To find a specific gene or genomic region, the user may type in the gene name, a DNA sequence, an accession number for an RNA, the name of a genomic cytological band (e.g., 20p13 for band 13 on the short arm of chr20) or a chromosomal position (chr17:38,450,000-38,531,000 for the region around the gene BRCA1).

Presenting the data in the graphical format allows the browser to present link access to detailed information about any of the annotations. The gene details page of the UCSC Genes track provides a large number of links to more specific information about the gene at many other data resources, such as Online Mendelian Inheritance in Man (OMIM) and SwissProt.

Designed for the presentation of complex and voluminous data, the UCSC Browser is optimized for speed. By pre-aligning millions of RNA secuences from GenBank to each of the 244 genome assemblies (many of the 108 species have more than one assembly), the browser allows instant access to the alignments of any RNA to any of the hosted species.

The juxtaposition of the many types of data allow researchers to display exactly the combination of data that will answer specific questions. A pdf/postscript output functionality allows export of a camera-ready image for publication in academic journals.

One unique and useful feature that distinguishes the UCSC Browser from other genome browsers is the continuously variable nature of the display. Sequence of any size can be displayed, from a single DNA base up to the entire chromosome (human chr1 = 245 million bases, Mb) with full annotation tracks. Researchers can display a single gene, a single exon, or an entire chromosome band, showing dozens or hundreds of genes and any combination of the many annotations.  A convenient drag-and-zoom feature allows the user to choose any region in the genome image and expand it to occupy the full screen.

Researchers may also use the browser to display their own data via the Custom Tracks tool. This feature allows users to upload a file of their own data and view the data in the context of the reference genome assembly. Users may also use the data hosted by UCSC, creating subsets of the data of their choosing with the Table Browser tool (such as only the SNPs that change the amino acid sequence of a protein) and display this specific subset of the data in the browser as a Custom Track.

Any browser view created by a user, including those containing Custom Tracks, may be shared with other users via the Saved Sessions tool.

Tracks 

Below the displayed images of the UCSC Genome browser are eleven categories of additional tracks that can be selected and displayed alongside the original data. Researchers can select tracks which best represent their query to allow for more applicable data to be displayed depending on the type and depth of research being done. These categories are as follows:

Analysis tools

The UCSC site hosts a set of genome analysis tools, including a full-featured GUI interface for mining the information in the browser database, a FASTA format sequence alignment tool BLAT that is also useful for simply finding sequences in the massive sequence (human genome = 3.23 billion bases [Gb]) of any of the featured genomes.

A liftOver tool uses whole-genome alignments to allow conversion of sequences from one assembly to another or between species. The Genome Graphs tool allows users to view all chromosomes at once and display the results of genome-wide association studies (GWAS). The Gene Sorter displays genes grouped by parameters not linked to genome location, such as expression pattern in tissues.

Open source / mirrors

The UCSC Browser code base is open-source for non-commercial use, and is mirrored locally by many research groups, allowing private display of data in the context of the public data. The UCSC Browser is mirrored at several locations worldwide, as shown in the table.

The Browser code is also used in separate installations by the UCSC Malaria Genome Browser and the Archaea Browser.

See also
 Ensembl
 ENCODE
 List of biological databases

References

External links
 
 On-line Training/Tutorials & User's Guides
 UCSC Genome tutorials (videos of YouTube)

Bioinformatics software
Genome databases
Bioinformatics
National Institutes of Health
Computational biology
Biological databases
University of California, Santa Cruz